Protein O-GlcNAc transferase also known as OGT or O-linked N-acetylglucosaminyltransferase is an enzyme that in humans is encoded by the OGT gene. OGT catalyzes the addition of the O-GlcNAc post-translational modification to proteins.

Nomenclature 

Other names include:
O-GlcNAc transferase
 OGTase
O-linked N-acetylglucosaminyltransferase
 Uridine diphospho-N-acetylglucosamine:polypeptide β-N-acetylglucosaminyltransferase

Systematic name: UDP-N-α-acetyl--glucosamine:[protein]-3-O-N-acetyl-β--glucosaminyl transferase

Function

Glycosyltransferase 
OGT catalyzes the addition of a single N-acetylglucosamine through an O-glycosidic linkage to serine or threonine and an S-glycosidic linkage to cysteine residues of nucleocytoplasmic proteins. Since both phosphorylation and O-GlcNAcylation compete for similar serine or threonine residues, the two processes may compete for sites, or they may alter the substrate specificity of nearby sites by steric or electrostatic effects. Two transcript variants encoding cytoplasmic and mitochondrial isoforms have been found for this gene. OGT glycosylates many proteins including: Histone H2B, AKT1, PFKL, KMT2E/MLL5, MAPT/TAU, Host cell factor C1, and SIN3A.

O-GlcNAc transferase is a part of a host of biological functions within the human body. OGT is involved in the resistance of insulin in muscle cells and adipocytes by inhibiting the Threonine 308 phosphorylation of AKT1, increasing the rate of IRS1 phosphorylation (at serine 307 and serine 632/635), reducing insulin signaling, and glycosylating components of insulin signals. Additionally, O-GlcNAc transferase catalyzes intracellular glycosylation of serine and threonine residues with the addition of N-acetylglucosamine. Studies show that OGT alleles are vital for embryogenesis, and that OGT is necessary for intracellular glycosylation and embryonic stem cell vitality. O-GlcNAc transferase also catalyzes the posttranslational modification that modifies transcription factors and RNA polymerase II, however the specific function of this modification is mostly unknown.

Protease 
OGT cleaves Host Cell Factor C1, at one or more of 6 repeating 26 amino acid sequences. The TPR domain of OGT binds to the carboxyl terminal portion of an HCF1 proteolytic repeat so that the cleavage region is in the glycosyltransferase active site above uridine-diphosphate-GlcNAc   The large proportion of OGT complexed with HCF1 is necessary for HCF1 cleavage, and HCFC1 is required for OGT stabilization in the nucleus. HCF1 regulates OGT stability using a post-transcriptional mechanism, however the mechanism of the interaction with HCFC1 is still unknown.

Structure 

The human OGT gene has 1046 amino acid residues, and is a heterotrimer consisting of two 110 kDa subunits and one 78 kDa subunit.  The 110 kDa subunit contains 13 tetratricopeptide repeats (TPRs); the 13th repeat is truncated. These subunits are dimerized by TPR repeats 6 and 7. OGT is highly expressed in the pancreas and also expressed in the heart, brain, skeletal muscle, and the placenta. There have been trace amounts found in the lung and the liver.  The binding sites have been determined for the 110 kDa subunit. It has 3 binding sites at amino acid residues 849, 852, and 935. The probable active site is at residue 508.

The crystal structure of O-GlcNAc transferase has not been well studied, but the structure of a binary complex with UDP and a ternary complex with UDP and a peptide substrate has been researched.  The OGT-UDP complex contains three domains in its catalytic region: the amino (N)-terminal domain, the carboxy (C)-terminal domain, and the intervening domain (Int-D). The catalytic region is linked to TPR repeats by a translational helix (H3), which loops from the C-cat domain to the N-cat domain along the upper surface of the catalytic region. The OGT-UDP-peptide complex has a larger space between the TPR domain and the catalytic region than the OGT-UDP complex. The CKII peptide, which contains three serine residues and a threonine residue, binds in this space. In 2021 a 5Å CryoEM analysis revealed the relationship between the catalytic domains and the intact TPR regions confirming the dimer arrangement first seen in the TPR alone X ray structure. This structure supports an ordered sequential bi-bi mechanism that matches the fact that “at saturating peptide concentrations, a competitive inhibition pattern was obtained for UDP with respect to UDP-GlcNAc.”

Mechanism of catalysis 

The molecular mechanism of O-linked N-acetylglucosamine transferase has not been extensively studied either, since there is not a confirmed crystal structure of the enzyme. A proposed mechanism by Lazarus et al. is supported by product inhibition patterns of UDP at saturating peptide conditions. This mechanism proceeds with starting materials Uridine diphosphate N-acetylglucosamine, and a peptide chain with a reactive serine or threonine hydroxyl group. The proposed reaction is an ordered sequential bi-bi mechanism.

The chemical reaction can be written as:

UDP-N-acetyl-D-glucosamine + [protein]-L-serine → UDP + [protein]-3-O-(N-acetyl-D-glucosaminyl)-L-serine
UDP-N-acetyl-D-glucosamine + [protein]-L-threonine → UDP + [protein]-3-O-(N-acetyl-D-glucosaminyl)-L-threonine

First, the hydroxyl group of serine is deprotonated by histidine 498, a catalytic base in this proposed reaction. Lysine 842 is also present to stabilize the UDP moiety. The oxygen ion then attacks the sugar-phosphate bond between the glucosamine and UDP. This results in the splitting of UDP-N-acetylglucosamine into N-acetylglucosamine – peptide and UDP. Proton transfers take place at the phosphate and histidine 498. This mechanism is spurred by OGT gene containing O-linked N-acetylglucosamine transferase. Aside from proton transfers the reaction proceeds in one step, as shown in Figure 2. Figure 2 uses a lone serine residue as a representative of the peptide with a reactive hydroxyl group. Threonine could have also been used in the mechanism.

Inhibitors 
Many inhibitors of OGT enzymatic activity have been reported. OGT inhibition results in global downregulation of O-GlcNAc. Cells appear to upregulate OGT and downregulate OGA in response to OGT inhibition.

5S-GlcNAc 
Ac45S-GlcNAc is converted intracellularly into UDP-5S-GlcNAc, a substrate analogue inhibitor of OGT. UDP-5S-GlcNAc is not efficiently utilized as a donor sugar by OGT, possibly due to distortion of the pyranose ring by replacement of oxygen with sulfur. As other glycosyltransferases utilize UDP-GlcNAc as a donor sugar, UDP-5S-GlcNAc has some non-specific effects on cell-surface glycosylation.

OSMI 
OSMI-1 was first identified from high-throughput screening using fluorescence polarization. Further optimization led to the development of OSMI-2, OSMI-3, and OSMI-4, which bind OGT with low-nanomolar affinity. X-ray crystallography showed that the quinolinone-6-sulfonamide scaffold of OSMI compounds act as a uridine mimetic. OSMI-2, OSMI-3, and OSMI-4 have negatively charged carboxylate groups; esterification renders these inhibitors cell-permeable.

Regulation 

O-GlcNAc transferase is part of a dynamic competition for a serine or threonine hydroxyl functional group in a peptide unit. Figure 3 shows an example of both reciprocal same-site occupancy and adjacent-site occupancy. For the same-site occupancy, OGT competes with kinase to catalyze the glycosylation of the protein instead of phosphorylation. The adjacent-site occupancy example shows the naked protein catalyzed by OGT converted to a glycoprotein, which can increase the turnover of proteins such as the tumor repressor p53.

The post-translational modification of proteins by O-GlcNAc is spurred by glucose flux through the hexosamine biosynthetic pathway. OGT catalyzes attachment of the O-GlcNAc group to serine and threonine, while O-GlcNAcase spurs sugar removal.

This regulation is important for multiple cellular processes including transcription, signal transduction, and proteasomal degradation. Also, there is competitive regulation between OGT and kinase for the protein to attach to a phosphate group or O-GlcNAc, which can alter the function of proteins in the body through downstream effects. 
OGT inhibits the activity of 6-phosophofructosekinase PFKL by mediating the glycosylation process. This then acts as a part of glycolysis regulation. O-GlcNAc has been defined as a negative transcription regulator in response to steroid hormone signaling.

Studies show that O-GlcNAc transferase interacts directly with the Ten eleven translocation 2 (TET2) enzyme, which converts 5-methylcytosine to 5-hydroxymethylcytosine and regulates gene transcription. Additionally, increasing levels of OGT for O-GlcNAcylation may have therapeutic effects for Alzheimer's disease patients. Brain glucose metabolism is impaired in Alzheimer's disease, and a study suggests that this leads to hyperphosphorylation of tau and degerenation of tau O-GlcNCAcylation. Replenishing tau O-GlcNacylation in the brain along with protein phosphatase could deter this process and improve brain glucose metabolism.

See also 

 O-GlcNAc
 O-GlcNAcase (OGA)
 O-linked glycosylation

References

External links 
The O-GlcNAc Database - A curated database for protein O-GlcNAcylation and referencing more than 14 000 protein entries and 10 000 O-GlcNAc sites.

 

EC 2.4.1
Enzymes
Genes on human chromosome X